Bartow Senior High School is the only high school in Bartow, Florida. It resulted from a merger of the whites-only Summerlin Institute and Union Academy, a school for African Americans, after desegregation.

History
Summerlin Institute was founded in 1887 as the first public high school in Bartow, Florida. It was named after Jacob Summerlin who donated large amounts of land to the cities of Bartow and Orlando. This school was the first brick school in the United States located south of Jacksonville, Florida. It was also the only public military school in Florida.

Union Academy dates to 1897 when it opened as an elementary school for African Americans. In 1923, a secondary school curriculum was added and Union Academy became a high school for African-Americans.

Summerlin Institute was relocated to the corner of Broadway Avenue and Tharp Street, the current location of Bartow High School, in 1927.

In 1968 Polk County, Florida schools were integrated and all high school students living in Bartow and surrounding areas were, for the first time, going to the same school. The name of Summerlin Institute was changed to Bartow Senior High School, and Union Academy became an integrated middle school. The name change was (and still is) controversial because Summerlin Institute was considered one of the more prestigious public schools in the Southern United States, but because the school was named after Jacob Summerlin, who was a slaveholder, many felt the name change was appropriate. Many (but not all) Bartowians consider the history, traditions, alumni, of Bartow High School to include the pre-1970 histories of Summerlin Institutes and Union Academy as well as the history of Bartow High School (1970–present), thus making the 1970 integration a "merger" of two schools. Others consider Summerlin Institute/Bartow High School one school, and Union Academy a now defunct high school, but current middle school.

In 1996, Bartow High School earned approval from the IBO to offer the International Baccalaureate Diploma program. The students pursuing this program are placed in the International Baccalaureate School, a school-within-a-school on the Bartow High campus.  While IB students attend many IB specific classes they take regular Bartow High School electives and participate in the Bartow High School athletic program. Beginning with the Class of 2010, it was only composed of students from western Polk County, due to the opening of a second IB school at Haines City High School for students from eastern Polk County. There is no longer principal for IB Bartow but the current head of schools is Mandy Craven.

In 2006, the Summerlin Academy was established as a military school originally located under the same roof as Bartow High School and International Baccalaureate School. In 2008, Summerlin moved to its own facility in Bartow.

In September 2021, a 15-year-old student was arrested after participating in the devious lick trend for damaging and stealing soap dispenses at Bartow.

Athletics
The school's nickname is the yellow jackets, although the school colors and uniforms are blue and orange (a result of the merge between Summerlin Institute and Union Academy; Summerlin's colors were orange and white and Union's colors were blue and white).

Over the last forty years, the school has won team and individual state championships in football, boys basketball, swimming, boys weightlifting and girls softball.

The girls' softball team is the only school to have appeared in a FHSAA state championship game for 10 consecutive years (1997–2006), winning 7 of those matches. Two Bartow pitchers became the first and second players in FHSAA softball history to pitch in four state championship games. Melissa Parsons pitched from 1997 to 2000, winning the '97 and '00 titles. Lindsay Littlejohn won four state title games from 2002 to 2005. Bartow also became the first team to win five consecutive state softball championships (2002–2006). In 2003, the program earned a No. 1 national ranking by the USA Today Coaches' Poll.

Notable alumni

Bartow High School
Tony Bradley (born 1998), basketball player (Utah Jazz)
Bob Crawford, former legislator in the Florida Senate 
John Laurent, state senator
Marcus Floyd (born 1978), Pastor, former NFL player for New York Jets, Buffalo Bills and Carolina Panthers #24 Jersey Retired on October 4, 2013
Odell Haggins - Longtime FSU assistant football coach, interim head coach, 2017.
Katherine Harris (born 1957), former Florida Secretary of State and former member of the United States House of Representatives
Jack Latvala, former Member of Florida Senate
Jason Odom (born 1974), former professional football player
Adam Putnam (born 1974), Florida Commissioner of Agriculture and former member of the United States House of Representatives

Summerlin Institute
 Charles O. Andrews - U.S. Senator from 1938 to 1946 
 Frank Clark - former Bartow City attorney, U.S. Representative for the 2nd District 1905-1925
 J. Adrian Jackson- Rear Admiral U.S. Navy.
James Van Fleet (1892–1992), head of U.S. forces in the Korean War
Spessard Holland (1892-1971), 28th Florida governor and U.S. Senator; founding partner of law firm Holland & Knight

Union Academy
Jim Battle, American football player for the Minnesota Vikings and Arizona Cardinals of the NFL
Major Hazelton, American NFL football player
Nat James, American NFL football player
Alton Lavan, American football player
Ken Riley, American football cornerback for the Cincinnati Bengals.
Sam Silas, American football player for the St. Louis Cardinals, New York Giants, and San Francisco 49ers.
Jerry Simmons, American football player for the Pittsburgh Steelers, Chicago Bears, and several other NFL teams.

References

External links

Bartow High School website
International Baccalaureate School at BHS

High schools in Polk County, Florida
Buildings and structures in Bartow, Florida
Public high schools in Florida
1887 establishments in Florida
Educational institutions established in 1887